The Pratt & Whitney R-2060 Yellow Jacket was a liquid-cooled aircraft engine project developed for the United States Army in the early 1930s. The engine had five banks of four in-line cylinders, and displaced 2,060 cubic inches. Designed to produce 1,000 hp, the engine produced 1,116 hp on its final run after 35 hours of testing. The engine was cancelled in favor of continuing development of Pratt & Whitney's air-cooled R-1830 Twin Wasp radial engine.

Specifications (R-2060)

See also

References
Notes

Bibliography

External links
 Photos of the XR-2060 at enginehistory.org

Pratt & Whitney aircraft engines
1930s aircraft piston engines